Intraparenchymal hemorrhage (IPH) is one form of intracerebral bleeding in which there is bleeding within brain parenchyma. The other form is intraventricular hemorrhage (IVH).

Intraparenchymal hemorrhage accounts for approximately 8-13% of all strokes and results from a wide spectrum of disorders. It is more likely to result in death or major disability than ischemic stroke or subarachnoid hemorrhage, and therefore constitutes an immediate medical emergency. Intracerebral hemorrhages and accompanying edema may disrupt or compress adjacent brain tissue, leading to neurological dysfunction. Substantial displacement of brain parenchyma may cause elevation of intracranial pressure (ICP) and potentially fatal herniation syndromes.

Signs and symptoms

Clinical manifestations of intraparenchymal hemorrhage are determined by the size and location of hemorrhage, but may include the following:
 Hypertension, fever, or cardiac arrhythmias
 Nuchal rigidity
 Subhyaloid retinal hemorrhages
 Altered level of consciousness
 Anisocoria, nystagmus
 Focal neurological deficits
 Putamen - Contralateral hemiparesis, contralateral sensory loss, contralateral conjugate gaze paresis, homonymous hemianopsia, aphasia, neglect, or apraxia
 Thalamus - Contralateral sensory loss, contralateral hemiparesis, gaze paresis, homonymous hemianopia, miosis, aphasia, or confusion
 Lobar - Contralateral hemiparesis or sensory loss, contralateral conjugate gaze paresis, homonymous hemianopia, abulia, aphasia, neglect, or apraxia
 Caudate nucleus - Contralateral hemiparesis, contralateral conjugate gaze paresis, or confusion
 Brain stem - Tetraparesis, facial weakness, decreased level of consciousness, gaze paresis, ocular bobbing, miosis, or autonomic instability
 Cerebellum - Ataxia, usually beginning in the trunk, ipsilateral facial weakness, ipsilateral sensory loss, gaze paresis, skew deviation, miosis, or decreased level of consciousness

Causes
 Hypertension
 Arteriovenous malformation
 Aneurysm rupture
 Cerebral amyloid angiopathy
 Intracranial neoplasm
 Coagulopathy
 Hemorrhagic transformation of an ischemic stroke
 Cerebral venous thrombosis
 Sympathomimetic drug abuse
 Moyamoya disease
 Sickle cell disease
 Eclampsia or postpartum vasculopathy
 Infection
 Vasculitis
 Neonatal intraventricular hemorrhage
 Trauma

In younger patients, vascular malformations, specifically AVMs and cavernous angiomas are more common causes for hemorrhage. In addition, venous malformations are associated with hemorrhage.

In the elderly population, amyloid angiopathy is associated with cerebral infarcts as well as hemorrhage in superficial locations, rather than deep white matter or basal ganglia. These are usually described as "lobar". These bleedings are not associated with systemic amyloidosis.

Hemorrhagic neoplasms are more complex, heterogeneous bleeds often with associated edema. These hemorrhages are related to tumor necrosis, vascular invasion and neovascularity. Glioblastomas are the most common primary malignancies to hemorrhage while thyroid, renal cell carcinoma, melanoma, and lung cancer are the most common causes of hemorrhage from metastatic disease.

Other causes of intraparenchymal hemorrhage include hemorrhagic transformation of infarction which is usually in a classic vascular distribution and is seen in approximately 24 to 48 hours following the ischemic event. This hemorrhage rarely extends into the ventricular system.

Pathophysiology

Nontraumatic intraparenchymal hemorrhage most commonly results from hypertensive damage to blood vessel walls e.g.:
- hypertension
- eclampsia
- drug abuse,
but it also may be due to autoregulatory dysfunction with excessive cerebral blood flow e.g.:
- reperfusion injury
- hemorrhagic transformation
- cold exposure
- rupture of an aneurysm or arteriovenous malformation (AVM)
- arteriopathy (e.g. cerebral amyloid angiopathy, moyamoya)
- altered hemostasis (e.g. thrombolysis, anticoagulation, bleeding diathesis)
- hemorrhagic necrosis (e.g. tumor, infection)
- venous outflow obstruction (e.g. cerebral venous sinus thrombosis).
Nonpenetrating and penetrating cranial trauma can also be common causes of intracerebral hemorrhage.

Diagnosis

Computed tomography (CT scan): A CT scan may be normal if it is done soon after the onset of symptoms. A CT scan is the best test to look for bleeding in or around your brain. In some hospitals, a perfusion CT scan may be done to see where the blood is flowing and not flowing in your brain.

Magnetic resonance imaging (MRI scan): A special MRI technique (diffusion MRI) may show evidence of an ischemic stroke within minutes of symptom onset. In some hospitals, a perfusion MRI scan may be done to see where the blood is flowing and not flowing in your brain.

Angiogram: a test that looks at the blood vessels that feed the brain. An angiogram will show whether the blood vessel is blocked by a clot, the blood vessel is narrowed, or if there is an abnormality of a blood vessel known as an aneurysm.

Carotid duplex: A carotid duplex is an ultrasound study that assesses whether or not you have atherosclerosis (narrowing) of the carotid arteries. These arteries are the large blood vessels in your neck that feed your brain.

Transcranial Doppler (TCD): Transcranial Doppler is an ultrasound study that assesses whether or not you have atherosclerosis (narrowing) of the blood vessels inside of your brain. It can also be used to see if you have emboli (blood clots) in your blood vessels.

Treatment

Intracerebral hemorrhages is a severe condition requiring prompt medical attention. Treatment goals include lifesaving interventions, supportive measures, and control of symptoms. Treatment depends on the location, extent, and cause of the bleeding. Often, treatment can reverse the damage that has been done.

A craniotomy is sometimes done to remove blood, abnormal blood vessels, or a tumor. Medications may be used to reduce swelling, prevent seizures, lower blood pressure, and control pain.

References

External links 

Neurotrauma
Stroke
Cerebrovascular diseases